The looking-glass world is the setting for Lewis Carroll's 1871 children's novel Through the Looking-Glass.

Geography

The entire country is divided into squares by a series of little brooks with hedges growing perpendicular to them.

Government
The land is contested by two competing factions, the Reds and the Whites. Each side has its King and Queen, bishops, knights, armies, and castles.

Inhabitants
Haigha
Hatta
Humpty Dumpty
The Lion and the Unicorn
Red King
Red Queen
The Sheep
Tweedledum and Tweedledee
White King
White Knight
White Queen

In other media
 The Looking-glass world is featured in Once Upon a Time in Wonderland. In this series, the world is known as Wonderland and the Looking-glass world is just a realm within Wonderland, ruled by the Red King and Queen.

See also
Wonderland (fictional country)

References

External links

 Map of "The Looking-Glass Lands" by Triple Ace Games

Fictional elements introduced in 1871
Alice's Adventures in Wonderland
Fictional kingdoms
Fantasy worlds